Stafford FM is a local community radio station serving Stafford, Staffordshire, England. It broadcasts on 107.3 FM and online. The station was one of two to apply in 2014 for an FM community radio licence to cover Stafford. The other was BFBS.

On 3 October 2014, Ofcom announced that both applications had been successful and that 5-year full-time licences will be awarded.

History

1990s 
There have been a number of volunteer-run radio broadcasting projects in the area at intervals over nearly 20 years, and many of the volunteers have taken part in several of them. An experimental project called the Stafford Broadcasting Society, organised by the late Robert Leighton (an electronics engineer and part-time presenter on Radio Caroline) carried out a restricted service licence (RSL) broadcast in the mid-1990s, using a transmitter near Hopton.

2001-2003 
Stafford FM was first set up in 2001 following conversations between its founders, former Signal Radio presenter Ray Crowther and local businessman Richard Lamont. A team of ex-Signal presenters was assembled, including Stu Haycock and Paul Heath, and 28-day RSL FM trials followed, serving Stafford and the surrounding area from studios in Gaol Mews and a transmitter near Hopton. It aimed to gain a permanent small-scale commercial radio licence from the then regulator, the Radio Authority. A total of four RSLs at six-month intervals were carried out between 2001 and 2003. By then the Radio Authority had been replaced by Ofcom, which announced that no more small-scale commercial radio licences were going to be handed out, so the project was put on ice indefinitely.

Between 2003 and 2012, Super Radio was in operation. Broadcasting by streaming on the internet, the station kept local radio in Stafford going.

2011-2012 
Stafford FM re-emerged as a community station in 2011, launching online. At the time, the station was based in studios on Marston Road, Stafford. While at the Marston Road studios, the station held three RSL licences, using a transmitter at the same Hopton site as the earlier project. This was in an attempt to gain a community radio licence for the town.

XL FM 
As a result of having to leave the studio building in December 2012, Stafford FM went off air for a time, until, on Sunday 3 February 2013, the station re-launched as XL FM. This was branded under a re-structuring, and the station promised a variety of shows and a wide range of music. However, it was announced on 19 August 2013 that the station would revert to its original name.

Stafford FM Present Day 
Stafford FM broadcast its eighth and final FM trail (RSL) for 28 days from Monday 31 March 2014 on 87.7 FM, using a transmitter at Mount Street in the town centre. After being awarded a full-time community FM licence from the broadcasting regulator (Ofcom) in October 2014, the station commenced full-time broadcasting on 107.3 FM at noon on Saturday 25 April 2015 with a live broadcast from the towns Market Square. In a nod to Signal Radio, one of the stations founders, Ray Crowther, launched the full time radio station with the song ‘Beautiful Noise’ by Neil Diamond. 

Broadcasts from studios in Mount Street, near to Stafford Market continued until April 2017 when the station re-located to Crabbery Street to a new broadcast centre with three studios and additional facilities.

In 2020 it was confirmed that Stafford FM had been granted a 5 year extension on their licence through until 2025. 

Some of the radio stations original presenters remain with Stu Haycock presenting the Breakfast Show, Ray Crowther on Mid Mornings and Ian ‘Big E’ Keeley on the Afternoon Drive Time Show.

References

External links
www.staffordfm.co.uk

2011 establishments in England
Community radio stations in the United Kingdom
Radio stations established in 2011
Radio stations in Staffordshire
Stafford